In business, a cost analyst is a professional responsible for analyzing a company's costs, or the use of available resources, and reports such analysis to management for decision-making and control. 
Additional to cost analysis generally, specific work includes whole-life cost analysis and cost–volume–profit analysis.

This role usually sits within the company's financial management area in general; sometimes, specifically, in "FP&A" (Financial planning and analysis). 
See also under , profitability analysis, and budget analyst.

Cost analysts require a strong background in cost accounting methods, and typically hold a business degree majoring in accountancy, or sometimes, the more focused Bachelor of Accountancy.
Due to the specialized nature of the role, cost accountants often also hold a relevant professional certification:
Globally recognized, are the CMA through IMA, and the CGMA through CIMA. 
Other regional bodies include ICAI in India, and ICMA in Australia.
See .

Financial analysts
Costs
Financial data analysis
Finance_occupations
Management accounting